Dream Weaver is the third album by jazz saxophonist Charles Lloyd, his first  released on the Atlantic label, and the first recordings by the Charles Lloyd Quartet featuring Keith Jarrett, Cecil McBee and Jack DeJohnette. The Allmusic review by Thom Jurek awarded the album 4½ stars and states "Dream Weaver is a fully realized project by a band — a real band — in which each member has a unique part of the whole to contribute... There were no records like this one by new groups in 1966".

Track listing
All compositions by Charles Lloyd except as indicated
 "Autumn Sequence: Autumn Prelude/Autumn Leaves/Autumn Echo" (Joseph Kosma, Johnny Mercer, Jacques Prévert, Lloyd) - 12:01  
 "Dream Weaver: Meditation/Dervish Dance" - 11:35  
 "Bird Flight" - 9:07  
 "Love Ship" - 5:54
 "Sombrero Sam" - 5:12  
Recorded on March 20, 1966

Personnel
Charles Lloyd - tenor saxophone, flute
Keith Jarrett - piano
Cecil McBee - bass
Jack DeJohnette - drums

Production
Phil Iehle - engineer
Marvin Israel - cover design
Charles Stewart - cover photography

References

1966 albums
Atlantic Records albums
Charles Lloyd (jazz musician) albums
Albums produced by Arif Mardin
Albums produced by George Avakian